Peter Stafford (1941 – July 20, 2007) was an American writer and author of the Psychedelics Encyclopedia. Stafford is also co-author with Bonnie Golightly of LSD: The Problem-solving Psychedelic, as well as other books on psychedelics.

Biography 
Stafford was born in Oakland, California. He attended Reed College and graduated from the University of Washington.

In 1961, while at Reed College, Stafford experimented with the Native American sacred cactus Peyote. He moved to the East Village in New York City in 1964, where he spent the next ten years.

He was the editor of Crawdaddy! magazine from 1969 to 1970. He was a contributor to High Times.

In 1974, Stafford moved to Santa Cruz, California, with the intention of reconnecting with his father, whom he had not seen since early childhood.

Stafford died on July 20, 2007, in Santa Cruz, apparently from a complete heart block and injuries sustained falling from a ladder in his home.

Selected works
 (with B. H. Golightly) LSD: The Problem-solving Psychedelic (1967) — also called LSD In Action (1969)
Psychedelic Baby Reaches Puberty (1971).
Psychedelic Encyclopedia (And/Or Press, 1977).  — republished in 1993 by Ronin Publishing 
 Magic Mushrooms (Ronin Publishing, 2003) 
 Psychedelics (Ronin Publishing, 2003).

References

External links
LSD: The Problem-Solving Psychedelic - Drug Library
Psychedelics Encyclopedia - Erowid reviews
Peter Stafford Papers (ca. 1960-1971)- Columbia University Libraries

1939 births
2007 deaths
Reed College alumni
American encyclopedists
American magazine editors
Accidental deaths from falls
Writers from Oakland, California
Psychedelic drug researchers
American psychedelic drug advocates
Accidental deaths in California
20th-century American journalists
American male journalists
People from the East Village, Manhattan